William Edward Kennedy   (April 5, 1861 – December 22, 1912) was a 19th-century baseball third baseman for the Cincinnati Outlaw Reds of the Union Association in 1884. He appeared in 13 games for the Reds and hit .208.

External links

1861 births
1912 deaths
Major League Baseball third basemen
Cincinnati Outlaw Reds players
19th-century baseball players
Baseball players from Kentucky